Alex Lloyd Hughes (born 29 September 1991) is an English cricketer. Hughes is a right-handed batsman who bowls right-arm medium pace. He was born in Wordsley.

Hughes played two matches for Staffordshire in the 2009 Minor Counties Championship against Norfolk and Cumberland.  Having played for the Derbyshire Second XI since 2009, Hughes made his full debut for Derbyshire in a Twenty20 match against Yorkshire in the 2011 Friends Provident t20, scoring an unbeaten 11 runs and bowling three wicket-less overs. Hughes did not feature in any further matches for Derbyshire in the 2011 season.

Hughes made his first-class debut against Sussex County Cricket Club at Hove in August 2013. He went on to hit his maiden first-class hundred against Northamptonshire in July 2015, scoring 111* in a first innings score of 361. Derbyshire went on to win the match by 7 wickets. At the start of the 2016 season, Hughes deputised as Derbyshire captain in the Natwest T20 blast in place of the injured Wes Durston. On 2 September 2016, Hughes scored his second first-class hundred against Gloucestershire, scoring 140 in the second innings of the match.

References

External links

1991 births
Living people
People from Wordsley
English cricketers
Staffordshire cricketers
Derbyshire cricketers